The 2015–16 A Group was the 92nd season of the top division of the Bulgarian football league system, and 68th since a league format was adopted for the national competition of A Group as a top tier of the pyramid. The season has started on 17 July 2015 and is expected to end in May 2016. The league is contested by ten teams. Ludogorets Razgrad were the defending champions, and successfully defended the title after Levski Sofia's home loss against Lokomotiv Plovdiv in the 29th round. The title is Ludogorets' fifth consecutive and overall.

Competition format
The league is contested by ten teams and will be played in a quadruple round robin format, with each team playing every other team four times over 36 rounds.

Teams
A total of 12 teams were set to contest the league, including the best 10 sides from the previous season, plus two promoted clubs from the lower  division B Group.

On 22 June 2015, the BFU announced the final list of participants for the 2015–16 season. CSKA Sofia and Lokomotiv Sofia were both denied a professional license for the following season due to outstanding debts and would have to compete in the V AFG or fold. The group was kept at 10 teams. Marek Dupnitsa and Haskovo, who finished in the bottom two places of the table at the end of previous season, also failed to receive professional license, and were relegated to V Group.

The relegated teams were replaced by Montana, the 2014–15 B Group champions and Pirin Blagoevgrad, the 2014–15 B Group runner-up. While Montana returns to the top division after two years, Pirin reaches again the highest class after 4 years.

Stadia and locations
Note: Table lists in alphabetical order.

Personnel and sponsoring
Note: Flags indicate national team as has been defined under FIFA eligibility rules. Players and Managers may hold more than one non-FIFA nationality.

Managerial changes

League table

Results

Relegation playoff

Positions by round

Season statistics

Top scorers

Note
1 Including 2 goals for Montana.

Updated on 28 May 2016

Hat-tricks

Updated on 28 April 2016

Clean sheets
 Levski Sofia – 13
 Ludogorets – 12
 Slavia Sofia – 12
 Beroe – 11

Transfers
List of Bulgarian football transfers summer 2015
List of Bulgarian football transfers winter 2015–16

References

2015-16
Bul
1